Wandoo is the common name for a number of Western Australian Eucalyptus species, all of which have smooth white bark.

The original "wandoo" is Eucalyptus wandoo. Additional species have been given this name because of a perceived likeness with E. wandoo. These include
 Eucalyptus redunca (wandoo)
 Eucalyptus accedens (wandoo, or powder-bark wandoo)
 Eucalyptus capillosa (wheatbelt wandoo)
 Eucalyptus lane-poolei (salmonbark wandoo)
 Eucalyptus livida (mallee wandoo)
 Eucalyptus nigrifunda (desert wandoo)

Eucalyptus
Rosids of Western Australia
Myrtales of Australia